Eslamabad-e Dowlatabad (also Romanized as Eslāmābād-e Dowlatābād; also known as Eslāmābād) is a village in Baghin Rural District, in the Central District of Kerman County, Kerman Province, Iran. At the 2006 census, its population was 91, in 20 families.

References 

Populated places in Kerman County